Pearpop is an American social media collaboration platform headquartered in Los Angeles. The company was co-founded by Cole Mason and Guy Oseary in October 2020. The platform's main feature is "Challenges," which allows brands to instantly activate creator campaigns, on-demand. Since its launch, the platform has gained more than 200,000 creators across TikTok, Instagram, and Twitter including Heidi Klum, Loren Gray, Snoop Dogg and Tony Hawk, among others.

History

Founding 
Cole Mason, an ex-YouTube creator and model signed to Ford Models, co-founded the company with Guy Oseary in October 2020 after identifying that there was no platform which allowed creators to predictably earn a living creating content.

Fundraising History 
In April 2021, Pearpop announced it raised a $10 million Series A from Alexis Ohanian's venture capital firm Seven Seven Six, following its $6 million seed round from Guy Oseary and Ashton Kutcher. The company also has a variety of angel investors including Amy Schumer, The Chainsmokers, Diddy, Gary Vaynerchuk and others.

Product Offerings 
Pearpop is a two-sided marketplace marketplace enabling creators to "Earn a Living Doing What They Love," directly enabling brand-to-creator collaboration as well as creator-to-creator collaboration. With Pearpop Challenges, brands can instantly activate creator campaigns, on-demand. Brands pay creators on a pay-for-performance basis. Pearpop verifies all creators and submissions are monitored 24/7 to ensure brand safety. The company works with large Fortune 500 brands including Netflix, Amazon, and others, as well as musical artists like Shawn Mendes, Doja Cat, and Madonna.

Recognition & Milestones 

 Pearpop was named to 2022 Fast Company's Most Company's Innovative Companies List, at #7 on the Social Media List
 Pearpop was named the "Airbnb of the Creator Economy" by Forbes
 CEO Cole Mason was named to the prestigious Forbes 30 under 30 List in November 2021
 In 2022, Pearpop appointed advertising & marketing executive Alex Morrison as Chief Marketing Officer
 In June 2022, Pearpop launched the first ever TikTok Live scripted comedy series, starring TikTok star Jericho Menke.

Reference section

External links
 

Internet properties established in 2020
Social media companies of the United States
2020 establishments in California
Companies based in Los Angeles